Uber Baccilieri (26 July 1923 – 29 January 2007) was an Italian boxer. He competed in the men's heavyweight event at the 1948 Summer Olympics.

References

1923 births
2007 deaths
Italian male boxers
Olympic boxers of Italy
Boxers at the 1948 Summer Olympics
Heavyweight boxers
Sportspeople from Ferrara
20th-century Italian people